Pizamar (Old Icelandic Pizamarr) is a Slavic deity worshipped on Rügen. His statue was overthrown by the Danes in 1168 together with statues of other gods on Rügen. He is mentioned only in Knýtlinga saga, which, however, does not give the functions of the god or his image. Nowadays his name may be transcribed into English as Pachomir, Pachemir. 

The Gesta Danorum and Knýtlinga saga describe the conquest of Rügen by the Danes. Both sources describe the destruction of the temple of Svetovit on Arkona, then the temples of Ruyevit, Porevit and Porenut in Charenza. The Knýtlinga saga, however, mentions further conquests, which are no longer described by the Gesta Danorum, and mentions the god Pizamar, who was worshipped in the nearby gord of Asund, nowadays identified with Zagard nearby the Black Lake:

There is general agreement that the Icelandic -marr corresponds to the Slavic suffix -mir (Proto-Slavic *-mirъ) found in many Slavic given names, which was adapted to the Old Icelandic phonetic system, but controversy arose over the reading of the first part of the theonym. The first letter was generally read as b or v (w): Aleksander Brückner read the name as Wszemir or Wyszemir, while others read it as Bezmir or Bezmiar, Běsomar, Bisomir, Bisomar, Bjessamar, Pečimir, and also as a continuation of the Proto-Slavic *bez(ъ)měrъ "unlimited strength".

Such etymologies, however, have drawbacks. Slavic words beginning with ⟨v⟩ in Old Icelandic were also written by initial v/w, cf. Old Icelandic warta ← Slavic *vor(o)ta, OI Waldimarr ← Slavic *Vol(o)dimār, etc., and words beginning with ⟨b⟩ were also written with an initial b, cf. OI Burisleif ← Slavic *Boleslavъ. Furthermore, Slavic words beginning with ⟨p⟩ were always written with an initial p, cf. OI polydi ← Slavic *poľudje, OI Palteskija ← Slavic *Polteskъ. Readings that contain an initial B or V/W should be considered unjustified.

According to Michał Łuczynski, the correct reading of the Slavic sound of the theonym is simple. In Old Icelandic borrowings from Slavic the letter z can reflect Slavic consonant ⟨c⟩, cf. OI dyfliza ← Slavic *tīmīnica, ⟨š⟩ cf. OI kaza ← Slavic *kaša, or possibly ⟨s⟩. This would allow one to reconstruct the segment as *Pica-, *Piša-, or *Pisa-. In loans to Old Icelandic, the Slavic vowel ⟨o⟩ was sometimes rendered as a after a consonant, cf. OI sabaló ← Slavic *sobolji, OI taparöks ← Slavic *topor-, etc.; this would allow reconstruction of the segment as *Pico-, *Pišo-, or *Piso-. An analysis of Slavic given names loans shows that the letter i in Old Icelandic, in addition to corresponding to Slavic ⟨i⟩ and ⟨y⟩, also corresponds to ⟨ě⟩, cf. OI Zytzebor (with the exchange i ↔ y) ← Old Polabian *Sieciebor. This would allow reconstruction of the theonym as *Pěcomirъ, *Pěšomirъ, or *Pěsomirъ. The forms with ⟨s⟩ or ⟨š⟩ must be rejected, since there are no attestations of this type of names in Slavic languages. Instead, the materials contain names similar to the form *Pěcomirъ, such as the Moravian given name Pačemirъ (9th century), or the Old Slovene female given name Pačemira (9th-10th century). The Polabian theonym would thus read *Pěčomirъ and would be a phonetic variant of the name Proto-Slavic given name *Pačemirъ with a → e apophony and an exchange of -e- for -o-, while ⟨č⟩ became devoiced to ⟨c⟩ in Old Icelandic. The name *Pačemirъ is composed of the Proto-Slavic *pače "more (used to form the comparative degree)" and the suffix *-mirъ, and the whole name would mean "more peaceful", "may he be (more) peaceful", "may he have more peace (mir)", and would be a wishing name.

According to Łuczynski, this name may have referred to Svetovit (-Ruyevit), which was meant to alleviate the impetuous nature of the god. Henryk Łowmiański, on the other hand, decided that it was the name of an "illustrious deceased" who was accidentally considered a deity by the chronicler.

References 
 Notes

 References

Bibliography 

 
 
 
 
 

Slavic gods